Antonio Valladares de Sotomayor (1737–1820) was a Spanish journalist, poet and writer.  He wrote over 100 plays during his lifetime.

Biography
de Sotomayor was born to a family of Galician nobles in 1737. He moved to Madrid in 1760. In 1785 he became a member of the Economic Society of Friends of the Country in Osuna.

As a journalist de Sotomayor published 34 volumes of Semanario Erudito (Weekly Scholar) which was composed of several unpublished works as well as criticism and moral, instructional, political, historical, satirical and humorous content. The publication ran from 1787 to 1791 and was continued in 1816 as the Nuevo Semanario Erudito (New Weekly Scholar).

In the late 1770s he began to write plays in collaboration with José Ibáñez and José López de Sedano and had his first success in the field of theatre in the 1780s.  Between 1797 and 1807 he wrote nine printed volumes of a novel that also achieved success, La Leandra.

References

Spanish male writers
Spanish journalists
1737 births
1820 deaths
Spanish poets
Spanish dramatists and playwrights